The 2021 British Rowing Junior Championships were the 49th edition of the National Junior Championships, held from 16–18 July 2021 at the National Water Sports Centre in Holme Pierrepont, Nottingham They are organised and sanctioned by British Rowing, and are open to British junior rowers.

Winners

References

British Rowing Junior Championships
British Rowing Junior Championships
British Rowing Junior Championships